Museo El Deposito is a history museum in the city of San Juan in Metro Manila, Philippines, which features the Carriedo water system, including the El Deposito underwater reservoir.

The museum is situated within the grounds of the Pinaglabanan Shrine. It opened on February 20, 2019.

Features
The Museo El Deposito is housed inside a two-storey building on top of the El Deposito underground reservoir and is beside the Museo ng Katipunan, another museum. It has three galleries namely: the Audio-Visual Room, Resource Center, and the Virtual Reality Room. The audiovisual room narrates the period prior to the establishment of the Carriedo Waterworks in 1882, the Resource Center features artifacts, photographs, prints and scale models, while the virtual reality room provides a re-enactment of the Battle of San Juan del Monte to the museum visitors. A entrance to an aqueduct of the El Deposito itself is also visible in one portion of the museum.

References

2019 establishments in the Philippines
Museums established in 2019
History museums in the Philippines
Museums in San Juan, Metro Manila
Buildings and structures in San Juan, Metro Manila